Girl Crazy is a 1932 American pre-Code musical film adaptation of the 1930 stage play of the same name. The film was very unlike the stage play except for its score. It was tailored for the comic talents of Wheeler & Woolsey, a popular comedy team of the time. Three songs written by George and Ira Gershwin for the play were retained: "Bidin' My Time", "I Got Rhythm", and "But Not for Me". According to RKO records, the film lost $150,000.

Plot

Cast
 Bert Wheeler - Jimmy Deagan 
 Robert Woolsey - Slick Foster 
 Eddie Quillan - Danny Churchill 
 Dorothy Lee - Patsy 
 Mitzi Green - Tessie
 Brooks Benedict - George Mason 
 Kitty Kelly - Kate Foster 
 Arline Judge - Molly Gray
 Stanley Fields - Lank Sanders
 Lita Chevret - Mary
 Chris-Pin Martin - Pete
 Monte Collins - Bartender

Soundtrack
 "Bidin' My Time"
Music by George Gershwin
Lyrics by Ira Gershwin
Sung by male quartet
 "I Got Rhythm"
Music by George Gershwin
Lyrics by Ira Gershwin
Performed by Kitty Kelly and chorus
 "You've Got What Gets Me"
Music by George Gershwin
Lyrics by Ira Gershwin
Sung by Bert Wheeler and Dorothy Lee
Danced by Bert Wheeler, Dorothy Lee and Mitzi Green
 "But Not for Me"
Music by George Gershwin
Lyrics by Ira Gershwin
Sung by Eddie Quillan and Arline Judge
Also sung by Mitzi Green

References

External links
 
 
 
 

1932 films
1932 musical comedy films
American musical comedy films
American black-and-white films
Films based on musicals
American films based on plays
Films directed by William A. Seiter
Films scored by Max Steiner
George Gershwin in film
Films with screenplays by Herman J. Mankiewicz
RKO Pictures films
1930s English-language films
1930s American films